Damayanti (Sanskrit: दमयंती) is a character in a love story found in the Vana Parva book of the Mahabharata

Damayanti or Damayanti may refer to:

Damyanthi (film), 2019 film in Kannada language
Nala Damayanthi (1959 film), a Tamil film directed by Kemparaj
Nala Damayanthi (2003 film), a Tamil film directed by Mouli
Damayanti (web series), 2020 Bengali web series

See also
Damayanti (given name)